The 1997 NCAA Division I Men's Golf Championships were contested at the 58th annual NCAA-sanctioned golf tournament for determining the individual and team national champions of men's collegiate golf at the Division I level in the United States.

The tournament was held at the Conway Farms Golf Club in Lake Forest, Illinois, a suburb of Chicago.

Pepperdine won the team championship, the Waves' first NCAA title.

Charles Warren, from Clemson, won the individual title through a playoff.

Individual results

Individual champion
 Charles Warren, Clemson (279*)

Team results

Finalists

Eliminated after 36 holes

DC = Defending champions
Debut appearance

References

NCAA Men's Golf Championship
Golf in Illinois
NCAA Golf Championship
NCAA Golf Championship
NCAA Golf Championship